The Central Railroad of New Jersey Station, also known as the Jersey Central Station and Jim Thorpe Station, is a historic railroad station located at Jim Thorpe, Carbon County, Pennsylvania. It was designed by Wilson Brothers & Company of Philadelphia, Pennsylvania, and built in 1888 by the Central Railroad of New Jersey.  It is a 1 1/2-story, five bay, red brick building in the Queen Anne style.  It features a 3 1/2-story, cylindrical corner tower with a cylindrical roof. It is owned by the Lehigh Gorge Scenic Railway and served as a visitor center. The station was one of two serving the community; the Lehigh Valley Railroad had a station on the opposite side of the river.

The station was added to the National Register of Historic Places on January 1, 1976.  It is located in the Old Mauch Chunk Historic District. Lehigh Gorge Scenic Railway operates passenger excursions out of the station.

See also
List of stations on the Central Railroad of New Jersey

References

External links
 

Historic American Engineering Record in Pennsylvania
Railway stations on the National Register of Historic Places in Pennsylvania
Queen Anne architecture in Pennsylvania
Railway stations in the United States opened in 1888
Former Central Railroad of New Jersey stations
Buildings and structures in Carbon County, Pennsylvania
Transportation in Carbon County, Pennsylvania
National Register of Historic Places in Carbon County, Pennsylvania